Tennessee Propellers, Inc, founded in 1981, was an American manufacturer of wooden propellers for homebuilt and ultralight aircraft. The company headquarters was located in Rising Fawn, Georgia.

By December 2020 the company website was up for sale and the company is presumed to have ceased business.

The company is also the distributor for parts for the discontinued Japanese Zenoah G-25 and G-50 line of aircraft engines. In the early 2000s they also produced their own powered parachute design, the Scout, but the aircraft is now out of production.

Aircraft
Tennessee Propellers Scout

See also
List of aircraft propeller manufacturers

References

External links

1981 establishments in Tennessee
2020 disestablishments in Tennessee
Aircraft propeller manufacturers
Companies established in 1981
Manufacturing companies based in Georgia (U.S. state)
Powered parachutes
Defunct aircraft manufacturers of the United States